The Stayers Chase Triple Crown was a Betfair initiative started in 2005 called 'Betfair Million' to award £1 million prize for any horse who wins in the same season the Betfair Chase at Haydock in November, the King George VI Chase at Kempton on Boxing Day and the Cheltenham Gold Cup at the Cheltenham Festival. In the following season it suffered a couple alterations which included the Lexus Chase as an alternative for the King George VI Chase or winning the Grand National whilst being placed in top two at any race at the Cheltenham Festival.

The £1 million bonus for the triple crown was eventually dropped by Betfair in the 2010 only to be reintroduced in 2015 by the Jockey Club which followed the same race format of the premier staying chase division:
Betfair Chase
King George VI Chase
Gold Cup

In the past legendary staying chasers such as Arkle, Desert Orchid and Best Mate had won the King George VI Chase at Kempton Park and the Cheltenham Gold Cup in the same season, however they never had the chance to complete the modern-day treble as the Betfair Chase was inaugurated in 2005. Only in 2006/2007 Kauto Star managed to complete the feat and be the first to win the £1 million bonus.

Leg Winners

References 

Racing series for horses
2005 establishments in England